Niklas Salo (born July 8, 1994) is a Finnish ice hockey player. He is currently playing with HC TPS in the Finnish Liiga.

Salo made his Liiga debut playing with HC TPS during the 2013–14 Liiga season.

References

External links

1994 births
Living people
Finnish ice hockey forwards
HC TPS players
People from Somero
Sportspeople from Southwest Finland